John Thomas Myers (February 8, 1927 – January 27, 2015) was an American 
politician who served 15 terms as a Republican congressman from Indiana's 7th congressional district in the United States House of Representatives from 1967 to 1997. 

His son-in-law, Brian D. Kerns, represented the same district from 2001 to 2003. Myers was married and had two daughters and five grandchildren.

Life and education 
Born in Covington, Indiana, Myers graduated from Covington High School in 1945 and earned his B.S. at Indiana State University in 1951. He also attended Eastern Illinois University where he was a member of the Sigma Pi fraternity.

Military service 
Myers served in the United States Army from 1945 to 1946.

Career 
He was a cashier and trust officer with the Fountain Trust Company from 1952 to 1966 and worked as a farmer in Fountain County.

Congress 
He was first elected to Congresd in 1966 and was re-elected fourteen more times, serving from 1967 until his retirement in 1997. Although he was the ranking Republican on the United States House Committee on Appropriations, after the Republicans took control of the House in 1994, Myers was passed over for the position by new House Speaker Newt Gingrich, giving the post to Bob Livingston.

Death 
Myers died at his home in Covington, Indiana on January 27, 2015, at the age of 87.

Memorialization
A pedestrian bridge connecting nearby cities Lafayette and West Lafayette in Tippecanoe County is named after Myers and opened in 1993.

A technology center is named for Myers at Indiana State University in Terre Haute, Indiana.

A lock and dam on the Ohio River are named for Myers.

References

External links

 

 

1927 births
2015 deaths
Farmers from Indiana
Eastern Illinois University alumni
Indiana State University alumni
United States Army soldiers
People from Covington, Indiana
Businesspeople from Indiana
20th-century American politicians
20th-century American businesspeople
Republican Party members of the United States House of Representatives from Indiana
Members of Congress who became lobbyists